This list of cultural references to the September 11 attacks and to the post-9/11 socio political climate, includes works of art, music, books, poetry, comics, theater, film, and television.

Art and design

A Garden Stepping into the Sky (2002–03) by Ron Drummond is a design for a World Trade Center Memorial built out of the "clay" of functional interior space suitable for commercial, cultural, or residential uses. Praised by New York novelist and critic Samuel R. Delany and architecture critic Herbert Muschamp, Drummond's design was the focus of a documentary by the award-winning independent filmmaker Gregg Lachow and was featured on CNN and KOMO-TV News.
9/11 Flipbook (2005–present) by Scott Blake allows viewers to watch a continuous reenactment of United Airlines Flight 175 crashing into the South Tower of the World Trade Center. Accompanying the images are essays written by a wide range of participants, each expressing their personal experience of the September 11 attacks. In addition, the essays' authors posted their responses to the request that they reflect on, and respond to, the flipbook itself.
Golden Angels Over Lower Manhattan (2011), a painting by the New-York based Polish artist, Leokadia Makarska-Cermak, who was in Lower Manhattan during the attacks. She presented the painting at the Sanctuary Still remembrance event held at the St. Ann and the Holy Trinity Church on September 11, 2011.
Save Manhattan, a series of works by the Moroccan artist Mounir Fatmi. Three Installations show Manhattan as if the attacks did not take place, and a light is projected to create a sharply defined shadow of the pre-9/11 skyline of the city. Save Manhattan 1 is made with books, Save Manhattan with videotapes and Save Manhattan 3 is a sound installation with speakers. In the Save Manhattan Video, the skyline progressively dissolves and becomes the memory and the ghost of something that was but that is not anymore.
September (2005), a painting by Gerhard Richter

Biology
Osama bin Laden (elephant) – an elephant in India nicknamed after the attacks’ mastermind due to its tendencies of reckless mass murder

Classical music

John Adams – On the Transmigration of Souls (2002) for chorus and orchestra
James Adler – Reflections upon a September morn (2002) for mezzo-soprano, oboe and piano 
Lera Auerbach – Violin Sonata no.2 "September 11" (2001)
Leonardo Balada – Symphony No. 5 "American" (2003)
Richard Blackford – Not in Our Time (2011)
Gloria Coates – String Quartet No. 8 (2001-2)
John Corigliano – One Sweet Morning (2011)
Anthony Davis – Restless Mourning (2002), oratorio for mixed chorus, chamber ensemble and live electronics, with texts by Quincy Troupe and Allan Havis.
David Del Tredici – 'Missing Towers (Perpetual Canon)', 3rd movement of Gotham Glory (2004) for solo piano
Bechara El-Khoury – New York, Tears and Hope (2001-5), for orchestra
Eric Ewazen - A Hymn for the Lost and the Living (2002) for wind ensemble
Mohammed Fairouz – Symphony No. 4 "In the Shadow of No Towers" (2012) for wind ensemble
Howard Goodall – Spared (2008), for chorus and piano, based on a poem by Wendy Cope.
Michael Gordon – The Sad Park (2006), written for the Kronos Quartet
Robert Gulya – Guitar Concerto (2001), written for Johanna Beisteiner
Stephen Hartke – Symphony No. 3 (2003)
Adolphus Hailstork – Armageddon (2012) for organ and percussion, and As Falling Leaves (2002) for viola, piccolo, flute and harp
William Lewarne Harris – Rescoria Variations (2001), opera by a Cornish composer commemorating the Cornish national hero Rick Rescorla, who died saving lives at the Twin Towers
Aivars Kalējs – Musica dolente (2001-3) for orchestra, dedicated to the innocent victims of the tragic events of September 11, 2001. The world premiere conducted by Andris Nelsons.
Aaron Jay Kernis – Sarabanda in memoriam, an arrangement for string orchestra of a movement from his Second String Quartet (1998)
Wojciech Kilar – September Symphony (2003)
Phil Kline – September 22 Vigil, a walking vigil performed in Manhattan on the evening of 22 September 2001, between Union Square and Washington Square.
Elodie Lauten – S.O.S.W.T.C. (2001), electronic
Arkady Luxemburg – Suite No. 2 for strings 'In Memory of the Victims of September 11, 2001'''
Ingram Marshall – September Canons (2002)
Cindy McTee – Adagio from Symphony No. 1 'Ballet' for Orchestra (2002)
Robert Moran – Trinity Requiem (2011) for children's choir
Stephen Paulus – Prayers and Remembrances (2011) for mixed chorus and orchestra
Krzysztof Penderecki – Piano Concerto Resurrection (2001–02, revised 2007)
George Quincy – Voices from Ground Zero (2003), chamber ensemble
Steve Reich – WTC 9/11 (2009-10), written for the Kronos Quartet
Terry Riley – Sun Rings (2002), written for the Kronos Quartet
Ned Rorem – Aftermath (2001-2), song cycle for medium voice, violin, cello, and piano
Gary Schocker – A Fond Farewell: Meditations on September 11 (2002), for flute and piano
Christopher Theofanidis – Heart of a Soldier (2011), opera, for San Francisco Opera
Joan Tower – In Memory (2001), written for the Tokyo String Quartet
Charles Wuorinen – September 11, 2001 (2001), premiered by William Ferguson, tenor and Phillip Bush, piano
 Chen Yi – Burning (2004) for string quartet
Ellen Taaffe Zwilich – Clarinet Concerto (2002)

Film
International11'09"01 September 11 (2002), an international anthology film composed of contributions from Bosnia-Herzegovina, Burkina Faso, Egypt, France, India, Iran, Israel, Japan, Mexico, United Kingdom, and the US, each exploring reactions to 9/11.Copilot (2021), a German-French film by Anne Zohra Berrached, based on United Airlines Flight 93's hijacker pilot Ziad Jarrah and his relationship with Aysel Sengün, prior to the events of the 9/11 attacks.

North America

Video, television, and theatrical release: documentaries102 Minutes That Changed America, a 2008 American made-for-television History Channel documentary which follows the events of 9/11 through raw footage.9/11, a 2002 Franco-American made-for-television CBS documentary which includes the only footage shot inside the World Trade Center that day.9/11: One Day in America, a 2021 6-part documentary miniseries for National Geographic.911: In Plane Site, a 2004 American documentary film which advocates 9/11 conspiracy theories.9/11: Inside the President's War Room, a 2021 American documentary film for Apple TV+.9/11 Kids, a 2020 Canadian documentary film about the now young adults who were in the classroom where president George W. Bush was reading "The Pet Goat" when he was interrupted and informed of the attacks.9/11: Press for Truth, a 2006 American independent film which investigates the events of 9/11.9/11: The Twin Towers, a 2006 American made-for-television Discovery Channel documentary about the events of 9/11.Answering the Call: Ground Zero's Volunteers, a 2005 American documentary film.Beyond Belief, a 2007 American independent film about the post-9/11 experiences of two women who lost their husbands on 9/11 and who set up a humanitarian program for war widows in Afghanistan.Bowling for Columbine, a 2002 American documentary film by Michael Moore that refers to the events of 9/11 in its "Wonderful World" montage.The Cats of Mirikitani, a 2006 American documentary about the painter Jimmy Mirikitani who lived in New York at the time of 9/11.Children of 9/11: Our Story, a 2021 American documentary about the children born to fathers who died during the September 11 attacks.The Concert for New York City, documentary of the five-hour benefit concert at Madison Square Garden.Countdown to Ground Zero, a 2006 American made-for-television History Channel documentary which covers a 9/11 timeline.United States of Banana, 2011 series of art films by photographer Michael Somoroff, based on the 9/11 novel United States of Banana by Hispanic-American author Giannina Braschi.Dixie Chicks: Shut Up and Sing, a 2006 American independent film about the backlash experienced by the country music band, Dixie Chicks during the Post-9/11 climate.Dust to Dust: The Health Effects of 9/11, a 2006 American documentary broadcast on the Sundance Channel.Fahrenheit 9/11, a 2004 American documentary film by Michael Moore.FahrenHYPE 9/11, reaction to the above filmFirefighters: Heroes of Ground Zero, a 2002 American made-for-television WNET documentary film following firemen from two firehouses in the days and weeks following 9/11.Flight 175: As the World Watched, a 2006 American made-for-television The Learning Channel documentary about United Airlines Flight 175.The Flight That Fought Back, a 2005 American made-for-television Discovery Channel documentary about United Airlines Flight 93, one of four planes that was hijacked on 9/11.Grounded on 9/11,  a 2005 American made-for-television History Channel documentary.Hijacking Catastrophe: 9/11, Fear & the Selling of American Empire a 2004 documentaryThe Heart of Steel, a 2006 American independent film about the post 9/11 experiences of a group of volunteers.Hotel Ground Zero, a 2009 American made-for-television History Channel documentary.I Missed Flight 93, a 2006 American made-for-television History Channel documentary about people who missed United Airlines Flight 93.Inside 9/11, a 2005 American made-for-television National Geographic Channel documentary about the events before, during, and after 9/11.The Love We Make, a 2011 American documentary about Paul McCartney's experiences in New York City after the September 11, 2001 attacks, following him as he prepared The Concert for New York City October 2001 benefit event.The Man Who Predicted 9/11, a 2002 American made-for-television History Channel documentary.Metal of Honor: The Ironworkers of 9/11, a 2006 American documentary.Native New Yorker, a 2005 American documentary.No Responders Left Behind, a 2021 American documentary.NYC Epicenters 9/11-2021½, a 2021 4-part American documentary by Spike Lee.On Native Soil: the Documentary of the 9/11 Commission Report, a 2005 American documentary.Rebirth, a 2011 American documentary about five individuals impacted by 9/11.The Outsider (2021), about the making of the National September 11 Memorial & Museum in New York CityThe Secret History of 9/11, a 2006 American documentary.The Tillman Story, a 2010 American independent film about the death of football star and Army Ranger Pat Tillman during the Post-9/11 climate.Toxic Clouds of 9/11, a 2006 American documentary.Toxic Legacy, a 2006 Canadian documentary.Twin Towers, a 2003 American documentary.Where in the World Is Osama Bin Laden?, a 2008 American documentary directed by Morgan SpurlockZero Hour: The Last Hour of Flight 11, a 2004 Canadian/British television documentary.

Video, television, and theatrical release: feature films

Middle East, South Asia, and diasporas

Video, television, and theatrical release: documentariesArabs and Terrorism (2007), an American documentary in six languages, filmed in 11 countries, comprising 120 interviews with "experts/politicians and hundreds of street interviews in the United States, Europe, and the Arab world."Being Osama (2004), a Canadian documentary that explores the Post-9/11 lives of six Montreal Arab men, all with the first name Osama.Divided We Fall: Americans in the Aftermath (2006), an American documentary made in response to the murder of a Sikh man as a result of the post-9/11 atmosphere.It's My Country Too: Muslim Americans (2005), a documentary that follows the journey of the South Asian rock music band Junoon during their tours to post-9/11 America.Stand Up: Muslim-American Comics Come of Age (2009), an American documentary about five stand-up comedians who respond to the post-9/11 atmosphere.

Video, television, and theatrical release: feature films

InternetIll Bethisad (1997–present), a collaborative alternate history project. Like in real life, September 11, 2001, was marked by a tragedy where two twin towers in New York City were attacked by terrorists although there are also several differences between the attacks in reality and the fictional alternate universe where Ill Bethisad takes place. The first difference is that "New York City" was never called by that name, instead using its original name of "New Amsterdam". The second difference is that two airships were used for the attack as airplanes never caught on in Ill Bethisad. Others include the face that the buildings themselves, the "World Trade Towers" are built in a style that resembling the Chrysler Building instead of the World Trade Center as well as that due the different structures between airships and airplanes, the towers did not completely collapse (although the top 20 floors of both do fall off thanks to an explosion caused by the airships using hydrogen instead of helium to fly). Another was that unlike real life, the attack on the towers was the only attack on that day. The final and most important differences to reality was that the attacks were done by a cult called "The Janus Fellowship" (named after "Janus" the Roman god of duality) who did it in an attempt to recreate a similar attack in a twin parallel world (implied to be the 9/11 attacks of real life) to allow the attackers to achieve enlightenment by a meaningful death. For four years, it was a mystery who caused the attacks as no organization claimed responsibility for the attacks while investigations stalled and conspiracy theories circulated. In fact, the collaborators of the Ill Bethisad project moved on to other parts of the storyline not related to the attacks and came up with the cult after realizing that they forgot to add a perpetrator.The Best Page in the Universe (1997–present), a satirical website run by George Ouzounian (better known as "Maddox"). One part of the site spoofs the 9/11 conspiracy theory film series Loose Change with a set of pages (and a corresponding YouTube video) titled "Unfastened Coins". Both parody Loose Change by applying the same methods that the series uses for 9/11 to another disaster, the Sinking of the Titanic in 1912. In "Unfastened Coins", Maddox joking purports the Titanic sinking was not an accident (which is indeed the case) but instead, the ship was deliberately sunk as part of a government conspiracy. As a result of this spoof, Maddox shows that the logic used by Loose Change is actually outlandish. On another page, with the title "There is no 9/11 conspiracy you morons", Maddox once again spoofs Loose Change by noting various inconsistencies with the series. For example, Maddox noted that Dylan Avery, the creator of Loose Change was still alive while noting that it 9/11 really is a government conspiracy then Avery would be dead by now because the US government would have assassinated him to stop the secret from leaking. Maddox noted how many people would need to be involved in such a large-scale conspiracy that Avery claims 9/11 was and showing that if that was true than one of those people would have revealed it by now. Maddox also claims that if one folds the backs of certain U.S. dollar notes depicting the White House, The note turns into two depictions of 9/11 though Maddox goes out of his way to show that it's a coincidence and that the notes had that design years before 9/11 even happened.

Literature and poetry

Fiction and non-fiction

Australia
"The Caribou Herd" (2003) by Miles Hitchcock won The Age Short Story Award in 2003. The narrator is an elderly English man with dementia, flying to New York on the day of the attacks and reminiscing about the 20th Century.

EuropeA Manhã do Mundo (The Morning of the World) (2001) by Pedro Guilherme-Moreira.Brick Lane (2003) by Monica Ali. The novel tells the story of Nazneen, a Bangladeshi woman who moves to England and her life before and after 9/11.Burnt Shadows (2009) by Kamila ShamsieDead Air (2002) by Iain Banks. An early chapter is set in London on September 11, 2001. The main protagonist is a left-wing radio "shock jock" attending a wedding when news of the attacks filters through (Tuesday afternoon British time).Eleven (2006) by David Llewellyn. The novel takes place in Cardiff and London on September 11 and deals with the impact the terrorist attacks have on the lives of people in the UK.False Impression (2005) by Jeffrey Archer. The novel is a thriller that takes place during and immediately after 9/11.Netherland (2008) by Joseph O'Neill. The novel tells the story of a Dutch businessman who lives in New York and is traumatized by the events of 9/11.Saturday (2005) by Ian McEwan. The novel is set in London after the September 11 attacks but before the 7 July 2005 London bombings. The novel shows how much the world has changed since the attacks in America.When God Was a Rabbit (2011) by Sarah Winman. The protagonist and her brother are living in America at the time of the 9/11 attacks, and the main character believes her brother and his best friend have died in the crash.Windows on the World (2003) by Frédéric Beigbeder. The novel is set in the restaurant at the top of the North Tower on September 11. It tells the story of Carthew Yorston and his two sons as they try to escape or somehow survive the attack. Each chapter of the book represents one minute in time between 8:30 and 10:30 on 9/11. It also features a parallel narrative wherein the author, a French writer sympathetic to America, discusses the process of writing the book and his motivations for doing so.

North AmericaAmerican Widow (2008) by Alissa Torres. A graphic novel by Alissa Torres, who was eight months pregnant when her husband Eddie Torres perished in the WTC on 9/11.Between Two Rivers (2004) by Nicholas RinaldiBleeding Edge (2013) by Thomas Pynchon. The novel is a detective story which takes place between the burst of the dot-com bubble and the aftermath of the September 11 attacks.Brooklyn Follies (2005) by Paul AusterThe Dark Tower VI: Song of Susannah (2004) by Stephen King. Two characters place an artifact known as Black Thirteen in a coin-op storage unit in the World Trade Center in 1999, intending to leave it there forever. After leaving, they half-jokingly discuss what would happen if the towers were to collapse on the object.A Disorder Peculiar to the Country (2006), by Ken Kalfus. The novel follows the lives of New Yorkers Joyce and Marshall Harriman who are in the middle of a nasty divorce. In the early morning hours of September 11, Marshall leaves for the World Trade Center and Joyce for the airport.The Emperor's Children (2006), by Claire Messud. The novel traces the lives of three NYC friends before and after the events of 9/11.Everyman (2006), by Philip Roth. The protagonist of the novel moves to the New Jersey shore as a result of the fear he feels in the wake of the 9/11 attacks.Extremely Loud and Incredibly Close (2005) by Jonathan Safran Foer. The novel follows the narrator, 9-year-old Oskar Schell, whose father was on the upper floors of the World Trade Center when the jets crashed into the Twin Towers. To fight his grief and quell his imagination, Oskar embarks on a quest to find what he hopes is his father's most illuminating secret. In service of this quest, Oskar conquers many of his irrational fears and comforts other damaged souls.Falling Man (2007), by Don DeLillo. The novel features a protagonist who survives the attacks on the World Trade Center.Forever (2003) by Pete Hamill. The novel tells the story of an Irish immigrant who is granted immortality, provided that he never leaves the island of Manhattan. Hamill completed his manuscript at 11:20 pm on the evening of September 10, 2001; he was about to deliver it to his editor when the attacks occurred. He spent another year revising the book. As a result, the 9/11 attacks form the culmination of 250 years of New York history described in the novel.The Good Life (2006) by Jay McInerney. The novel takes place immediately before, during, and after the events of 9/11.Home Boy (2009) by H. M. Naqvi. The novel tells the story of three Pakistani college students, AC, Jimbo and Chuck, before and after 9/11.
"In Spirit", a science fiction novella by Pat Forde, published in Analog in September 2002 and nominated for a Hugo Award. A time travel story in which a form of "spiritual" time travel is perfected in the middle of the 21st century and the aged children of 9/11 victims are given the opportunity to go back in time and be with their loved ones "in spirit" in their final moments.Last Night in Twisted River (2009) by John Irving. Portions of the end of the novel take place on September 10 and 11, 2001, and deal with several characters' reactions to learning about the attacks.The Last Illusion (2014) by Porochista Khakpour
"Let the Great World Spin" (2009) by Colum McCann. The novel focuses on Philippe Petit's 1974 tightrope crossing of the Twin Towers, and the effects it has on New Yorkers in 1974. At the end, the novel jumps to 2005, in which one of the character's daughters deals with living in a post-9/11 world, connecting the destruction of the towers to Petit's 1974 walk.The Man Who Wouldn't Stand Up (2012) by Jacob Appel. The novel depicts the life of fictional botanist Arnold Brinkman, a New Yorker falsely branded a terrorist-sympathizer in the aftermath of the 9/11 attacks.
"The Mutants" (2004) a short story by Joyce Carol Oates in I Am No One You Know: Stories.Night Fall (2004) by Nelson DeMille. The novel connects TWA Flight 800 to the September 11 attacks.Patriot Acts: Narratives of Post-9/11 Injustice (2011, non-fiction) edited by Alia Malek.Pattern Recognition (2003) by William Gibson. The first novel to address the attacks; the main character is a marketing consultant whose father disappeared in Manhattan on the morning of September 11.Saffron Dreams (2009) by Shaila Abdullah.Small Wonder, a collection of 23 essays on environmentalism and social justice by novelist and biologist Barbara Kingsolver, published in 2002 and written in response to the aftermath of the September 11 attacks.
"The Suffering Channel" (2004) is a novella by David Foster Wallace in Oblivion: Stories. Set in July 2001, its central protagonist, Skip Atwater, is a journalist who works for the fictional Style Magazine, which is located in the World Trade Center. Atwater is attempting to write an article about a midwestern artist, Brint Moltke (whose excrement reportedly resembles famous cultural objects) for the September 10, 2001 issue of Style.Sons and Other Flammable Objects (2007) by Porochista KhakpourTerrorist (2006) by John Updike. The novel explores post 9/11 America through the eyes of a radical Muslim youth and his Jewish guidance counselor.
"The Things They Left Behind" (2005) by Stephen King. A short story about survivor guilt.Theater of the Stars: A Novel of Physics and Memory (2003) by N. M. Kelby. The novel centers on two women, a mother and daughter. Both of them are physicists - and both of them have dizzying gaps in their memories of their pasts.United States of Banana (AmazonCrossing 2011) by Giannina Braschi is a dramatic novel in which the collapse of the Twin Towers marks the fall of the American empire on September 11, 2001.United We Stand (2009) a novel that focuses on the aftermath of the attacks.Villa Incognito (2003) by Tom Robbins. The novel features several scenes of military and CIA officials reacting to news of the attacks.We All Fall Down (2006) by Eric Walters. September 11, 2001 was "Bring Your Kids to Work Day", and the main protagonist, Will was going to meet with his father in his office in the World Trade Center. This novel focuses on how Will and his relationship with his father changes on the day of the 9/11 attacks.The Zero (2006) by Jess Walter is a novel about Brian Remy, a New York City police officer suffering memory gaps in the wake of 9/11.

PoetryAnything Can Happen (2004) by Seamus Heaney (a loose translation of Horace's Ode 1.34) is a response to the attacks.Photograph from September 11 (2002) by Wisława SzymborskaCurse (2002) by Frank BidartDidactic Elegy by Ben LernerFallacies of Wonder (2001) by Richard Howard is poem about the difficult task of trying to remember the Twin Towers as they actually were now that they are gone.Inventory (2006) by Dionne Brand is a collection of poems written about the importance of witnessing in a globalized post-9/11 world.Routine Procedure(s) 2: Prayer Beads of Cold Sweat or Driving While Izlaamic (2006) by Ismail Khalidi (writer)The Hudson Remembers (2008) by Pascale PetitSeptember 2001, New York City (2013) by Sharon OldsOut of the Blue (2005) by Simon ArmitageThe Names (2002) by Billy CollinsLast Words (sequence) (2002) by Michael Symmons Roberts19 Varieties of Gazelle: Poems of the Middle East (2002) by Naomi Shihab Nye; explores the lives of people in the Middle East in the aftermath of the September 11 attacks.December (2001) by Frederick Seidel contains the line "I am flying into area code 212/ To stab a Concorde into you", referring to Manhattan's famous area code. It was published in the Wall Street Journal on December 13th, 2001.

TelevisionEuphoria (2019) - In the pilot episode, Rue Bennett narrates that she was born “three days after 9/11” while a plane crashes into one of the towers.Family GuyIn the episode "It Takes a Village Idiot, and I Married One", Lois Griffin repeatedly chants "Nine-eleven" to gain voters at a rally while running for mayor.
In a deleted scene from "Meet the Quagmires", when Brian and Peter Griffin go back in time, Brian gets into a fight, and instructs the bar patron to meet on top of the World Trade Center on September 11, 2001.
In the episode "Baby Not on Board", the family stops at Ground Zero at their way to the Grand Canyon to pay their respects. Peter remarks "Ground Zero, so this is where the first guy got AIDS". Brian corrects Peter telling him it was the site of the 9/11 attacks. Then, Peter believes Iraq (under Saddam Hussein) had something to do with the attacks, but those were untrue. 
In "Back to the Pilot", Stewie and Brian travel back in time to the pilot episode which took place on January 31, 1999. While in the past, Brian informs his former self about 9/11. This causes it never to happen and when they travel back to the present the United States is in the middle of a second civil war due to the fact George W. Bush never won the 2004 U.S. presidential election.
In "Big Man on Hippocampus", during Fast Money round on Family Feud, when Lois was asked to name a favorite holiday, Stewie answered 9/11. 
In the episode "Back to the Woods", Peter attempts to get revenge on actor James Woods by going on The Late Show with David Letterman and, pretending to be Woods, tells the world that he is starring in an HBO comedy putting a positive light on 9/11, called September 11th 2000-FUN!, about a window washer who has just finished cleaning the last window of the twin towers; when he turns to get off the scaffolding he sees an airplane and screams "Oh come on!" Peter then makes several evil 9/11 remarks to add to his speech and claims that the plane will be voiced by comedian David Spade, which angered the real James Woods who said he would never work with Spade.
In the straight-to-DVD never-shown-on-television episode "Partial Terms of Endearment", a special feature shows a storyboarded scene that was never made part of the episode; in the scene, Peter attempts to kill Lois's unborn fetus by using boxing gloves attached to remote-controlled planes. Two of these glove-planes end up demolishing two sand towers that Stewie is building, causing him to exclaim "This is no accident; we're under attack!", and a third glove-plane is shown to land in a part of the yard labeled 'Shanksville'; all of this is a clear parody of the events of 9/11.Fringe (2008–2013) - The show repeatedly references the 9/11 attacks, and depicts an alternate reality where the White House was destroyed, but the World Trade Centre was left standing.Homeland (2011–2020) - The show centers on the characters of Carrie Mathison (Claire Danes), a bipolar Central Intelligence Agency officer, and Nicholas Brody (Damian Lewis), a homecoming U.S. Marine. Mathison has come to believe that Brody, who was held captive by al-Qaeda as a prisoner of war, was "turned" by the enemy and now supposedly poses a serious threat to the security of the United States. The series' first season in particular plays with the steadily-shifting equilibrium of not-knowing who-is-who and thrillingly depicts the aftermath of 9/11 as a national trauma and the fragile state the nation's collective mind has been left with.Ramy (2019) - In "Strawberries," the fourth episode of Ramy, the lead character as an adolescent is already having enough trouble fitting in before the terrorist attacks make him even more isolated at his New Jersey middle school. Footage of the smoking towers is seen only briefly, for establishing purposes, on the screen of his classroom.The Lone Gunmen (2001) - In the pilot episode of this short-lived spinoff of The X-Files, the plot has similarities to both the 9/11 attacks itself and popular conspiracy theories about them, which is completely coincidental because it aired in March 2001, six months before the real attacks. The episode involves the eponymous conspiracy theorists The Lone Gunmen uncovering a plot by rogue members of the U.S. government to hijack an airliner, fly it into the World Trade Center, blame it on terrorists and use it to start a war. In the episode, The Lone Gunmen successfully foil the plot by taking over the controls and flying it away just before it hits the towers. Travelers - The first test of sending human consciousness through time involved sending a man to the World Trade Center on September 11, minutes before Flight 11 crashed into the North Tower. The test is featured in the first episode of season 2.

TheaterThe Domestic Crusaders (2005) by Wajahat Ali. The play is about a Pakistani-American Muslim family grappling with their own internal struggles, the changing dynamics of American society and a globalized, post-9/11 world.The God of Hell (2004) by Sam Shepard. The play was written in part as a response to the post-9/11 atmosphere.The Guys (2001) by Anne Nelson. The play explores the memories and emotions of a surviving fire captain and a writer who helps him write eulogies for his lost comrades.The Mercy Seat (2002) by Neil LaBute. The play is about a protagonist who considers faking his death after having coincidentally survived the attacks.Recent Tragic Events (2003) by Craig Wright. The play takes place on September 12, 2001, and deals with a blind date between a man and a woman who is trying to reach her sister, who lives in New York.Omnium Gatherum (2003) by Theresa Rebeck and Alexandra Gersten-Vassilaros. The play involves a sophisticated dinner party of characters talking about and who perished in the 9/11 attacks.Elegies (2003), a song cycle by William Finn about deaths of friends and family, concludes with three songs about the September 11 attacks and the aftermath.Truth Serum Blues (2005) by Ismail Khalidi. The play tells of the story of Kareem a "young Arab-American" whose life is changed by the Post-9/11 atmosphere.United States of Banana (2011) by Giannina Braschi is a cross-genre dramatic work conjuring a post-9/11 world in which Hamlet, Zarathustra, and Giannina are on a quest to liberate Segismundo who is trapped in the dungeon of the Statue of Liberty after the fall of the World Trade Center on September 11, 2001.Good Morning Gitmo (2014) by Mishu Hilmy and Eric Simon is a one-act dark comedy. The play takes place decades into the future, where the warden creates a deranged morning talk show for the staff and detainees stuck on Camp Delta. The play devolves when actual visitors from the mainland arrive.Come From Away (2017) is a Canadian musical by Irene Sankoff and David Hein set in the small town of Gander, Newfoundland. It tells the story of the town's response to 38 US-bound international flights that were diverted to Gander International Airport as part of the Canadian government's Operation Yellow Ribbon, almost doubling the population of the small town overnight. The musical tells the story from the points of view of the townspeople, various passengers, and American Airlines pilot Beverley Bass. After premiering on Broadway in 2017, Come From Away won Best Direction of a Musical at the 71st Tony Awards and was a nominee for Best Musical.Ordinary Days (2008) by Adam Gwon. In the song "I'll Be Here", the character Claire recalls the events of September 11 and the loss of her husband in the attack, coincidentally on their one-year wedding anniversary.

See also
List of entertainment affected by the September 11 attacks
Cultural influence of the September 11 attacks

References

External links
The Collected Works: How artists, writers, musicians, filmmakers, video-game designers, and quilters responded to the attacks—a selection - New York Magazine'', August 27, 2011.
Rebuilding NYC: 9/11 in Art and Culture: September 11 Film and Video Documentaries; a lengthy list of September 11-related documentaries. The site also has lists of books, songs, theater and works in other media inspired by September 11.

Aftermath of the September 11 attacks
 
 
September 11 attacks